Alexandria Anderson (born January 28, 1987) is an American track and field sprinter who specializes in the 100-meter dash and 200-meter dash. She was the 2011 American champion in the 60-meter dash.

Anderson won four Chicago city volleyball titles at Morgan Park High School. She started running at the age of six in the streets against boys. She was recruited to run summer track and fell in love with the sport.

She was an All-American for University of Texas Longhorns. She won the NCAA outdoor 100m in her senior year in 2009.

She earned a place on the 4x100 relay as an alternative in the 2009 IAAF World Championships in Athletics and 2011 World Championships in Athletics. She ran the second leg in the 2009 edition but the exchange was fumbled between her and third leg runner Muna Lee they were then disqualified. She won a gold medal running the anchor leg in the preliminary rounds stopping the clock in 41.94 in Daegu.

Personal bests

References

Texas University Profile

External links
 
 

1987 births
Living people
Track and field athletes from Chicago
American female sprinters
African-American female track and field athletes
World Athletics Championships athletes for the United States
World Athletics Championships medalists
Texas Longhorns women's track and field athletes
Track and field athletes from Illinois
USA Indoor Track and Field Championships winners
World Athletics Championships winners
21st-century African-American sportspeople
21st-century African-American women
20th-century African-American people
20th-century African-American women